The 2021 FIBA U20 European Challengers were international basketball competitions which took place from 19 to 25 July 2021, replacing the cancelled 2021 FIBA U20 European Championship.

History
The 2020 edition of FIBA U20 European Championship was to be held in Klaipėda, Lithuania, but was postponed to 2021 due to COVID-19 pandemic. 
Since the pandemic continued in 2021, the FIBA Europe decided to hold alternative format of competition to replace traditional format of U20 European Championship where 16 or more teams gather in one place.

Structure
 The events are to be played on a voluntary participation basis, with promotion/relegation to be frozen across Divisions A, B and C.
 The Top 18 ranked teams (16 currently in Division A, plus two additional teams by 2019 ranking in respective category) to play three tournaments of six teams each (Groups A, B and C).
 All other registered teams, ranked 19 and lower, to play in tournaments of up to six teams each (Groups D/E).
 All tournaments to be played in Round Robin format, with groups to be created by "serpentine" style allocation, taking the hosting situation into consideration.

Participating teams

Top-18 Challengers
 
 
 
 
 
 
 
 
 
 
 
 
 
 
 
 
 
 

19–26 Challenger

Top-18 Challengers

Group A
The Group A tournament was played in Brno, Czech Republic.

Group B
The Group B tournament was played in Tbilisi, Georgia.

Group C
The Group C tournament was played in Heraklion, Greece.

19–26 Challenger
The Groups D/E tournament was played in Sopron, Hungary.

Group phase

Group D

Group E

Consolation round

23rd–26th place semifinals

25th place match

23rd place match

Final Four

19th–22nd place semifinals

21st place match

19th place match

Final standings

See also
 2021 FIBA U18 European Challengers
 2021 FIBA U16 European Challengers
 2021 FIBA U20 Women's European Challengers
 2021 FIBA U18 Women's European Challengers
 2021 FIBA U16 Women's European Challengers

References

External links
Official website
Competition schedule

FIBA Europe Under-20 Challengers
FIBA U20 European Championship
Basketball competitions in Europe between national teams
Europe
Sport in Brno
Sports competitions in Tbilisi
Sport in Heraklion
Sport in Sopron
July 2021 sports events in Europe
FIBA U20